Gary Baker is a former NASCAR driver. He made one Winston Cup start at Talladega Superspeedway in 1980. He started 15th and finished 22nd, earning $3,440. He was driving the #4 Waylon Jennings Chevrolet fielded by G.C. Spencer.

In 2007, he purchased the Busch Series team Brewco Motorsports, quickly renaming it to Baker Curb Racing.

References

External links

1946 births
American racing drivers
Living people
NASCAR drivers
NASCAR team owners
Racing drivers from Nashville, Tennessee
Racing drivers from Tennessee
Sportspeople from Nashville, Tennessee